Manuel Machado may refer to:

Manuel Machado (composer) (1590–1646), Portuguese composer of early Baroque music
Manuel Machado (football manager) (born 1955), Portuguese football manager
Manuel Machado (poet) (1874–1947), Spanish poet, part of the Generation of '98
Manuel E. Machado (born 1967), businessman
 Manny Machado (Manuel Arturo Machado, born 1992), Dominican-American professional baseball player